Martin Henry Garrity Jr. (January 30, 1900 – August 30, 1972) was an American football and baseball player, coach of football, basketball, and baseball, and college athletics administrator.  He served as the head football coach at Wake Forest University from 1923 to 1925, compiling a record of 19–7–1.  Garrity was also the head basketball coach at Wake Forest from 1923 to 1925, tallying a mark of 33–14.  He served as the head baseball coach at the University of Missouri in 1923 and at Wake Forest from 1924 to 1925.

Garrity was an alumnus of Princeton University, from which he graduated in 1922. At Princeton he played football and baseball.  Garrity came to Missouri in 1922 as an assistant football coach.  There he served under head coach Thomas Kelley.

Garrity was born on January 30, 1900, in Quincy, Massachusetts.  He died on August 30, 1972, in Boston, where he had resided in his later years.

Head coaching record

Football

References

1900 births
1972 deaths
American men's basketball coaches
American football halfbacks
Missouri Tigers baseball coaches
Missouri Tigers football coaches
Princeton Tigers baseball players
Princeton Tigers football players
Wake Forest Demon Deacons athletic directors
Wake Forest Demon Deacons baseball coaches
Wake Forest Demon Deacons football coaches
Wake Forest Demon Deacons men's basketball coaches
Sportspeople from Quincy, Massachusetts
Basketball coaches from Massachusetts
Baseball coaches from Massachusetts